The women's 400 metres event at the 1971 Pan American Games was held in Cali on 2 and 3 August. It was the first time that this distance was contested by women at the Games.

Medalists

Results

Heats

Final

References

Athletics at the 1971 Pan American Games
1971